The Jonathan Amis House is a historic house in McCains, Tennessee, USA.

History
The land was granted to William Pillow in 1820. By 1837, he sold some of it to Jonathan Amis. The latter built this house with yellow poplar in 1857–1858. It was designed in the Greek Revival architectural style.

Architectural significance
It has been listed on the National Register of Historic Places since April 26, 1984.

References

Houses on the National Register of Historic Places in Tennessee
Greek Revival houses in Tennessee
Houses completed in 1858
Houses in Maury County, Tennessee
National Register of Historic Places in Maury County, Tennessee
1858 establishments in Tennessee